The women's 3000 metres steeplechase at the 2018 IAAF World U20 Championships was held at Ratina Stadium on 10 and 13 July.

Records

Results

Heats
Qualification: First 3 of each heat ( Q ) and the 6 fastest times ( q ) qualified for the final. The overall results were as follows:

Final

References

3000 metres steeplechase
Steeplechase at the World Athletics U20 Championships